Jelonki, prior to 1951 known as Jelonek, is a resicential neighbourhood in the city of Warsaw, Poland, located within the district of Bemowo. The Municipal Information System of Warsaw divides the neighbourhood into two areas, Jelonki Północne (North Jelonki) and Jelonki Południowe (South Jelonki).

History 
The folwark-type settlement of Jelonek had been established in the 19th century, next to the village of Odolany (both now part of city of Warsaw, Poland). In 1932, the settlement had been renamed to Miasto-Ogród Jelonek (Garden Town of Jelonek) as part of the development of the area in accordance to the garden city movement. It was incorporated, as a neighbourhood into the city of Warsaw on 14 May 1951, with its name changed to Jelonki.

Boundaries 
The boundaries of the neighbourhood are defined by the Górczewska Street to the north, Lazurowa Street to the south, Warszawa Główna Towarowa railway station to the south, and the tracks of the railway line no. 509 between Warszawa Główna Towarowa and Warszawa Gdańska. In accordance to the Urban System of Information of Warsaw, the neighbourhood borders Chrzanów to the east, and Górce to the north.

References 

Neighbourhoods of Bemowo
Populated places established in the 19th century